Charles-Eugène Panet (November 27, 1829 – November 22, 1898), Liberal, representing Quebec. He was appointed on 27 March 1874 by Alexander Mackenzie. He served until his resignation on 4 February 1875.

Education
He was born in Quebec on November 27, 1829. He was the son of The Hon. Philippe Panet, late Judge of the Court of Queen's Bench, Lower Canada. His mother, Luce Casgrain, was the daughter and co-heiress of Pierre Casgrain (1771-1828) J.P., Seigneur of La Bouteillerie. Panet was a nephew of politicians Louis Panet and Charles Panet. He was educated at the Quebec Seminary and at the Jesuit College in Georgetown, Quebec. He studied law in Quebec with his relation The Hon. Jean-Thomas Taschereau, late of the Supreme Court of Canada. He was called to the Bar of Lower Canada in 1854.

Family

He was married three times and had sixteen children. The former Panet House, was built in Ottawa, Ontario by Colonel Charles-Eugène Panet, Deputy Minister of Militia and Defence, in 1876. In 1986, the Panet house became part of the King Edward Avenue Heritage Conservation District. The house is currently the Embassy of the Republic of Angola.

Career
He practiced law for three years in Quebec (1854–1857). He was coroner for the City and District of Quebec for fourteen years. He was a Lieutenant-Colonel of the 9th Voltigeurs de Québec (1869–80). In 1886, he was gazetted a Colonel in the Canadian Militia. In 1874 he was called to the Senate of Canada. In 1875, he resigned his seat in the Senate to accept the position of deputy minister of militia and defence, (1875–98). In 1888, he presented to Parliament a "Report upon the suppression of the rebellion in the North-West Territories and matters in connection therewith" Department of Militia and Defence.

He retained this position until shortly before his death at Ottawa on November 22, 1898.

Memorial

The Panet House (1906) at the Royal Military College of Canada was named in his honour.

References
 W. Stewart WALLACE, ed., The Encyclopedia of Canada, Vol. V, Toronto, University Associates of Canada, 1948, 401p., p. 81. P. G. Roy, La famille Panet (Lévis, 1906).
 The Canadian Biographical Dictionary and Portrait Gallery of Eminent and Self-Made Men, Ontario Volume, 1880. Panet, Lieut. Col. Hon. Charles E.
 Charles-Eugène Panet "Report upon the suppression of the rebellion in the North-West Territories and matters in connection therewith", presented to Parliament Ottawa, 1885.[Department of Militia and Defence].

External links

 

1829 births
1898 deaths
Canadian lawyers
Canadian senators from Quebec
Liberal Party of Canada senators
Canadian Militia officers
Canadian coroners
Les Voltigeurs de Québec
Les Voltigeurs de Québec officers